Evan Benjamin Oakley is an American poet.

Life
He graduated from George Mason University with an MFA, the University of Northern Colorado, and Colorado State University.

He teaches at Aims College in Greeley, Colorado.

His work has appeared in Ploughshares,

Awards
 Colorado Council on the Arts Poetry Award (1997)
 Dana Award for 2004.

Works

Anthologies

References

Year of birth missing (living people)
Living people
American male poets
George Mason University alumni
University of Northern Colorado alumni
Colorado State University alumni